Mimozaena virescens is a species of beetle in the family Carabidae, the only species in the genus Mimozaena.

References

Paussinae